The Hunan–Hubei–Jiangxi Soviet, historically referred to as the Hunan–Hupeh–Kiangsi Soviet was a Comintern and local communist-led liberated zone in the 1930s south of the Yangtze River, comprising parts of counties in what are now the municipal regions of Yueyang in Hunan, Xianning in Hubei and, in Jiangxi, Jiujiang and Yichun. It was a constituent part of the territorially discontiguous and diplomatically unrecognised Chinese Soviet Republic (CSR). Before the declaration of the CSR in November 1931, the liberated zone had been known to Communists as the Hunan-Hubei-Jiangxi (Xiang-E-Gan) Revolutionary Base Area (湘鄂赣革命根据地).

Embargo and menace

The Right-Kuomintang (Nationalist) Government intended to destroy the Soviet by means of one of its broadly unsuccessful Encirclement campaigns. The Communist response is known as the Counter-Encirclement Campaign at the Hunan–Hubei–Jiangxi Soviet (or, since the action pre-dates the establishment of the CSR, the Counter-Encirclement Campaign at the Hunan-Hubei-Jiangxi Revolutionary Base).

The Hunan–Hubei–Jiangxi Soviet was defended by the Red 16th Army. The 16th launched a pre-emptive strike on Tongcheng, in Hubei, in December 1930, annihilating an entire regiment of the KMT army just before it could begin the first attack of the campaign. The Government forces had to withdraw temporarily to regroup. The 16th, with help of fraternal CSR Soviets, held off danger to the Hunan–Hubei–Jiangxi Soviet until May 1931.

Coordinated defense
As reinforcement troops from other Nationalist Government regions moved in to avenge the defeat at Tongcheng, it was determined at Red Army central command that a diversionary measure was in order. The forces of the Hunan-Jiangxi Soviet accordingly struck two positions in government-held Hunan, one directly to their west and the other to their south. The gambit foiled the Encirclement Campaign against the Hunan–Hubei–Jiangxi Soviet by depriving it of essential strength.

References

External links 

Former socialist republics
Chinese Civil War
Chinese Soviet Republic